Catherine Joly is a French classical pianist, born in Belfort.

Biography 
She obtained a First Prize for piano and for chamber music. She also worked with Jean Hubeau and Annie d'Arco. She also obtained the Concertist Diploma from the École Normale de Musique de Paris.

Catherine Joly has been a soloist at Radio France since 1978, and at the Cziffra and Menuhin foundations since 1981. She performs as soloist and in chamber ensembles in France and abroad (Switzerland, Germany). Among the places to which she has been invited, the Festival Estival de Paris, the defunct Mai Musical de Bordeaux, the Besançon International Music Festival.

Selected recordings 
 Reynaldo Hahn: Premières valses; Le Rossignol Éperdu; Accord publisher
 Vincent d'Indy: Grande Sonate en mi, Op. 63; Helvetia, 3 valses, Op.17; Cybelia publisher, CY 707
 Stephen Heller: Works for piano; Accord publisher

Sources 
 Official website

References 

Musicians from Belfort
21st-century French women classical pianists
20th-century French women classical pianists
Year of birth missing (living people)
Living people
Conservatoire de Paris alumni
Signatories of the 1971 Manifesto of the 343